The Pennsylvania State Game Lands Number 249 are Pennsylvania State Game Lands in northeastern Adams County in Pennsylvania in the United States.

Geography
The nearest cities are Biglerville, Bendersville, Arendtsville. The western parcel is drained by the Conewago Creek (west). The center parcel is drained by the Bermudian Creek and North Branch Mud Run. The eastern parcel is also drained by the North Branch Mud Run as well as the main branch of Mud Run . Pennsylvania Route 234 passes nearby to the north of the western parcel and touches the southernmost point of the center parcel. U.S. Route 15 passes north and south between the same two parcels. Pennsylvania Route 94 running north and south touches the westernmost point of the eastern parcel. The area consists of low ridges and agricultural, woodlots, and developed areas.

Besides hunting and fishing, the Game Lands is popular for horseback riding, hiking, mountain biking, and bird watching.

Statistics
It was entered into the Geographic Names Information System (GNIS) on 1 April 1990 as identification number 1208343.

Biology
Game in the Game Lands include deer (Odocoileus virginianus), dove (Zenaida macroura), Gray fox (Urocyon cinereoargenteus), Red fox (Vulpes vulpes), pheasant (Phasianus colchicus), rabbit (Sylvilagus floridanus), raccoon (Procyon lotor), turkey (Meleagris gallopavo), woodcock (Scolopax minor), and trout.

See also
 Pennsylvania State Game Lands

References

203
Protected areas of Adams County, Pennsylvania